Oh Chanukah (also Chanukah, Oh Chanukah) is an English version of the Yiddish Oy Chanukah.  The English words, while not a translation, are roughly based on the Yiddish. "Oy Chanukah" is a traditional Yiddish Chanukah song. "Oh Chanukah" is a very popular modern English Chanukah song. This upbeat playful children's song has lines about dancing the Horah, playing with dreidels, eating latkes, lighting the candles, and singing happy songs. The song was written by Mordkhe (Mark) Rivesman, and first published in Susman Kiselgof's 1912 Lider-Zamlbukh [Song anthology].

Naming
According to archives at the University of Pennsylvania Library,  "Freedman Jewish Music Archive", alternate names the Yiddish version of song has been recorded under include "Khanike Days, "Khanike Khag Yafe", "Khanike Li Yesh", "Latke Song (Khanike Oy Khanike)", "Yemi Khanike", and "Chanike Oy Chanike."  Chanukah is and was sometimes written as Khanike as that was the standard transliteration from Yiddish according to the YIVO system.

Versions

Alternate Yiddish versions and pronunciations

A very common Yiddish version of the song is below with alternate words, lines, verses, or pronunciations on the right. This version follows the original published version rather than the more popular variant given above. The bolded words are what is changed. The "(x2)" in the bottom left indicated that part is repeated.

Hebrew version
There is also a Hebrew version (ימי החנוכה), which has the same melody, its words penned by Avraham Avronin. The words correspond roughly to the original (more so than the English version), with slight variations for rhyme and rhythm’s sake, to match the Sephardic pronunciation which serves as the basis for Modern Standard Hebrew. Thus the first line names the holiday; the second calls for joy and happiness (using two synonyms); in the third the speakers say they'll spin dreidels all night; in the fourth they will eat latkes (note that sufganiyot (סופגניות) could also mean latkes in early Modern-Hebrew); in the fifth the speaker calls everyone to light the Chanukah candles; the sixth mentions the prayer Al Hanissim, "On the miracles". The only big change is in the last line - whereas the original calls to praise God for the miracles he performed, the Hebrew one praises the miracles and wonders performed by the Maccabees. This reflects the anti-religious polemic of early Zionism, evident in many other Israeli Chanukah songs. Dati Leumi Jews sing an altered version of the line which includes a call to praise God.

In Israel, it’s still a very popular song, but since the country has a rich inventory of Chanukah songs it is not as exclusively popular as the English version in English speaking countries, or the Yiddish version in the past.

See also
 Hanukkah
 Hanukkah music
 Passover music
 Christmas music
 Ma'oz Tsur

References

External links
 YouTube Video - Young boy singing "Oy Chanukah" (the Yiddish version)

Hanukkah music
Jewish songs
Yiddish-language songs